The Vuelta Ciclista a Castilla y León is a professional road bicycle stage race held in Castile and León, Spain. Since 2005, Vuelta a Castilla y León has been a part of the UCI Europe Tour.

Past winners

References

External links
 

 
UCI Europe Tour races
Cycle races in Spain
 
Recurring sporting events established in 1986
1986 establishments in Spain